Healthcare in Turkey consists of a mix of public and private health services. Turkey introduced universal health care in 2003. Known as Universal Health Insurance , it is funded by a tax surcharge on employers, currently at 5%. Public-sector funding covers approximately 75.2% of health expenditures. 

Despite the universal health care, total expenditure on health as a share of GDP is the lowest among OECD countries at 6.3% of GDP, much lower than the OECD average of 9.3%. Median age in Turkey is 30 compared to 43.9 in EU countries. Aging population is the prime reason for higher healthcare expenditure in the developed world. Average life expectancy is 78.5 years, compared with the EU average of 81 years. Turkey has a high obesity rate, with 29.5% of its adult population obese.

Coverage

Due to major health reforms in the 2000s and 2010s, universal health insurance coverage for the population was achieved, and the general quality of health services improved greatly, with patient satisfaction rising from 39.5% in 2003 to 75.9% in 2011.

The following medical treatments are covered by the SGK:

 Emergencies
 Work accidents and vocational illnesses
 Infectious diseases
 Preventive health services (substance use)
 Childbirth
 Extraordinary events (injuries from war and natural disasters)
 Fertility treatment for women younger than 39
 Cosmetic surgery deemed medically necessary

While some SGK-contracted hospitals offer dental care, in most cases, patients must rely on private dental services and are responsible for covering the costs. In addition, patients must partially cover the cost of some prescription drugs and outpatient services.

Statistics

Medication

As measured in defined daily doses per 1,000 inhabitants per day Turkey had a high rate of consumption of antibiotics in 2015 with a rate of 38.8, double that of the United Kingdom.

Medical tourism 
There is a substantial medical tourism business in Turkey, with almost 178 thousand tourists visiting for health purposes in the first six months of 2018.  67% used private hospital, 24% public hospitals and 9% university hospitals.  The Regulation on International Health Tourism and Tourist Health came into force on July 13th 2017. It only applies to those coming specifically for treatment.

Private healthcare

There is also a large private healthcare sector. Private health services often offer shorter waiting lists and higher quality services. Most banks and insurance companies offer health plans, and contract with certain hospitals and doctors.

The Turkish healthcare system used to be dominated by a centralized state system run by the Ministry of Health. In 2003 the governing Justice and Development Party introduced a sweeping health reform program aimed at increasing the ratio of private to state health provision and making healthcare available to a larger share of the population. Information from the Turkish Statistical Institute states that 76.3 billion liras are being spent on healthcare annually, with 79.6% of funding coming from the Social Security Institute and most of the remainder (15.4%) coming from out-of-pocket payments. There are 27.954 medical institutions, 1.7 doctor for every 1000 people and 2.54 beds for 1000 people.

Turkey had a scheme called green card (Yeşil Kart), which was developed in order to help low-income social group to get medical help. Spending on this system were equal to 40 billion TL in 2010. Due to this fact, the system was reformed in 2011 and the number of people who could benefit from this system was reduced. Following the 2012 Universal Health Insurance Law, the Green Card system was abolished.

Finance

Turkey had the lowest expenditure on healthcare in Europe in 2015 - 6.4% of Gross domestic product.

Total health spending according to the Turkish Statistical Institute data has exceeded 201 billion pounds in 2019.

See also
 Health in Turkey
 Turkish Medical Association

References